Valgus hemipterus is a smallish species of scarab beetle (family Scarabaeidae) found in the Northern Hemisphere.

Subspecies
Subspecies include:
Valgus hemipterus hemipterus (Linnaeus, 1758) 
Valgus hemipterus meridionalis Rössner, 2014

Distribution
This species occurs from the Caucasus and Turkey to North Africa and southern and central Europe (Albania, Austria, Belarus, Belgium, Bosnia and Herzegovina, Bulgaria, Central European Russia, Croatia, Cyprus, Czech Republic, Denmark, European Turkey, France, Germany, Greece, Hungary, Italy, Latvia, Lithuania, Luxembourg, Republic of North Macedonia, Northwest European Russia, Poland, Portugal, Romania, Slovakia, Slovenia, South European Russia, Spain, Switzerland, The Netherlands, Ukraine, Yugoslavia).

The species has been introduced to the Nearctic realm, in parts of North America, especially Ontario, Michigan and Ohio.

Description
This species reaches a body length of 6–10 mm. The basic color is black or dark brown. The scales on the body of the male are dark brown with a light pattern, while most scales in females are dark. Pronotum is rather serrate along lateral edges, a transverse medial ridges is not well developed and  basal margin is quite rounded. The elytrae are shortened and do not cover the entire body. Pronotum and elytra show patches of light-colored setae.

Females bear a striking long acuminate telson - unusual fact in Coleoptera - with a central groove near apex and irregular lateral serrations, which makes them easily distinguishable from the males. In addition, The males have a different drawing than the females.

Biology
These beetles, which can be found from May to June on flowers or wood, are relatively common. The species has one generation (univoltine) and hibernates as a pupa.

Adult females usually oviposit to moist, rotting wood and use their acuminate telson to create the site of oviposition. The larvae live in the soil and feed on dead wood of birch and other trees.

Gallery

Bibliography
Harde, Severa: Der Kosmos Käferführer, Die mitteleuropäischen Käfer, Franckh-Kosmos Verlags-GmbH & Co, Stuttgart 2000,  (German)
Möller, G., Schneider, M. (1991): Kommentierte Liste ausgewählter Familien überwiegend holzbewohnender Käfer von Berlin-West mit Ausweisung der gefährdeten Arten (Rote Liste). In: Auhagen, A., Platen, R., Sukopp, H. (Hrsg.): Rote Listen gefährdeter Pflanzen und Tiere in Berlin. - Landschaftsentwicklung und Umweltforschung, Sonderheft 6, 1991: S. 373-420. (German)
Jiři Zahradník, Irmgard Jung, Dieter Jung et al.: Käfer Mittel- und Nordwesteuropas, Parey Berlin 1985,  (German)

References

External links 

Beetles (Coleoptera) and Coleopterists
Valgus hemipterus photos at Beetlespace.wz.cz

Cetoniinae
Beetles described in 1758
Articles containing video clips